Darcy Guttridge (born 30 October 1999) is an Australian rules footballer playing for the St Kilda Football Club in the AFL Women's (AFLW). She previously played for the Collingwood Football Club from 2018 to 2019. Guttridge was drafted by Collingwood with the club's second selection and the 9th pick overall in the 2018 AFL Women's draft. She made her debut in a loss to Carlton at Ikon Park in round 5 of the 2019 season. In April 2019, she departed the club and joined expansion side St Kilda. It was revealed Guttridge had signed on with the Saints for one more year on 30 June 2021, tying her to the club until the end of the 2021/2022 season.

Guttridge's partner Bianca Jakobsson also plays for AFLW club St Kilda.

Statistics
Statistics are correct to the end of the 2019 season.

|- style="background:#EAEAEA"
| scope="row" text-align:center | 2018
| 
| 34 || 0 || — || — || — || — || — || — || — || — || — || — || — || — || — || — || 0
|-
| scope="row" text-align:center | 2019
| 
| 34 || 3 || 3 || 1 || 9 || 14 || 23 || 2 || 3 || 1.0 || 0.3 || 3.0 || 4.7 || 7.7 || 0.7 || 1.0 || 0
|- class="sortbottom"
! colspan=3 | Career
! 3
! 3
! 1
! 9
! 14
! 23
! 2
! 3
! 1.0
! 0.3
! 3.0
! 4.7
! 7.7
! 0.7
! 1.0
! 0
|}

References

External links 

 

1999 births
Living people
Collingwood Football Club (AFLW) players
Australian rules footballers from Victoria (Australia)
St Kilda Football Club (AFLW) players
Lesbian sportswomen
Australian LGBT sportspeople
LGBT players of Australian rules football
21st-century LGBT people